Thomas Jukes may refer to:

 Thomas H. Jukes, biologist
Thomas Jukes (MP) (died 1628), MP for Bishop's Castle (UK Parliament constituency) and Montgomery Boroughs